Duh is the debut full-length album released by the punk rock band Lagwagon.

Production and marketing

Duh was recorded in January 1992 at Westbeach Recorders with producer Fat Mike. Frontman Joey Cape on the recording:

Reception

Duh was released in October 1992 and became one of Fat Wreck Chords' highest selling releases. Although it did not enter any charts, Duh has been regarded by some critics as one of the most influential punk rock albums released in the 90s.

Duh was re-released in 2007 as a limited repressing of 524 copies on purple vinyl.

Track listing
Original release
 "Tragic Vision" – 2:33
 "Foiled Again" – 1:34
 "Bury the Hatchet" – 2:46
 "Angry Days" – 3:14
 "Noble End" – 1:38
 "Child Inside" – 2:09
 "Bad Moon Rising" (Creedence Clearwater Revival cover) – 1:49
 "Beer Goggles" – 2:43
 "Inspector Gadget" – 0:24
 "Parents Guide to Living" – 1:45
 "Mr. Coffee" – 2:15
 "Of Mind and Matter" – 2:45
 "Stop Whining" – 2:36
 "Lag Wagon" – 2:49

2011 reissue disc one bonus tracks
"Demented Rumors" (outtake) – 2:50
 "Noble End" (early version) – 1:40
 "Angry Days" (acoustic) – 3:54

2011 reissue disc two (tracks performed by Lagwagon while under the name Section VIII)
Super Big Demo
 "Super Big Demo Radio Spot" – 0:14
 "Color Blind" – 3:14
 "Parents Guide to Living" – 1:49
 "Beer Goggles" – 2:51
 "Child Inside" – 2:14
 "Foiled Again" – 1:37
 "Noble End" – 1:43
 "Life Without You" – 2:10
 "Bury the Hatchet" – 3:14
 "The Bonus Ballad of Bilbo Baggins" – 0:31
 "Freedom of Choice" (Devo cover) – 2:35
 "Demented Rumors" – 3:01
 "Stop Whining" – 2:45

89 Demo
"No Hard Feelings" – 4:12
 "Truth and Justice" – 1:45
 "Lost in Another Time" – 3:24
 "No Conviction" – 2:14
 "Holy Shit" – 3:21
 "Goleta Shuffle" – 4:29
 "Jaded Ways" – 4:21
 "Tragic Vision" – 4:28
 "Runs in the Family" – 6:18

Personnel
Joey Cape – vocals
Chris Flippin – guitar
Shawn Dewey – guitar
Jesse Buglione – bass
Derrick Plourde – drums
Fat Mike - producer, additional vocals
Donnell Cameron - engineer
Joe Peccerillo - engineer
El Hefe - additional vocals

References

External links

Duh at YouTube (streamed copy where licensed)

Lagwagon albums
1992 debut albums
Fat Wreck Chords albums